Abbas Ibrahim Assi (born 9 July 1995) is a Lebanese footballer who plays as a midfielder or right-back for  club Shabab Sahel and the Lebanon national team.

Club career 
On 8 January 2022, Assi joined Iraqi Premier League side Naft Maysan on a six-month loan from Shabab Sahel. He made his debut on 8 February, coming on as a half-time substitute in a 1–1 draw against Al-Naft. Assi suffered a severe injury to his right foot in May that ended his season prematurely, forcing him to return to Lebanon to undergo surgery. As the initial surgery was not successful, he underwent a second – successful – surgery in October which extended his return a further three months.

International career 
Assi made his international debut for Lebanon on 6 November 2014, coming on as a substitute in a 3–2 friendly defeat to the United Arab Emirates.

Style of play 
Mainly used as a central midfielder, Assi has also been deployed as a right-back.

Career statistics

International

Honours 
Shabab Sahel
 Lebanese Elite Cup: 2019
 Lebanese Challenge Cup: 2014, 2015
 Lebanese Second Division: 2017–18

References

External links

 
 
 
 

1995 births
Living people
People from Sidon District
Lebanese footballers
Association football midfielders
Association football fullbacks
Shabab Al Sahel FC players
Naft Maysan FC players
Lebanese Premier League players
Lebanese Second Division players
Iraqi Premier League players
Lebanon youth international footballers
Lebanon international footballers
Lebanese expatriate footballers
Lebanese expatriate sportspeople in Iraq
Expatriate footballers in Iraq